Dear Green Place is a television series set in Glasgow.

Dear Green Place may also refer to:

 The city of Glasgow, Scotland, of which "Dear Green Place" is a popular nickname 
 The Dear Green Place, a novel by Archie Hind, which takes its title and setting from Glasgow